Abiola Temi-Tope Onakoya (born 10 October 1990) is a Nigerian sprinter specialising in the 400 metres. He represented his country in the 4 × 400 metres relay at the 2013 World Championships and 2016 World Indoor Championships.

Competition record

Personal bests
Outdoor
200 metres – 20.83 (+1.7 m/s, El Paso 2013)
400 metres – 45.79 (Calabar 2013)

Indoor
400 metres – 47.40 (Birmingham, AL 2014)

References

External links

1990 births
Living people
Nigerian male sprinters
Sportspeople from Ogun State
People from Ijebu Ode
World Athletics Championships athletes for Nigeria
UTEP Miners men's track and field athletes